The Tunisian Olympic Committee (IOC code: TUN) is the National Olympic Committee that represents Tunisia in the Olympic Movement. It was founded and recognized by the IOC in 1957. It is based in Tunis. It is member of the International Olympic Committee (IOC), the Association of National Olympic Committees of Africa and others international sports organisation.

List of presidents

See also
 Tunisia at the Olympics

External links 
 Official website

Tunisia
Olympic
Tunisia at the Olympics
1957 establishments in Tunisia
Sports organizations established in 1957